Nokia 105 is the name of a series of different mobile phones manufactured or marketed by Nokia. Models earlier than the 2021 4G version communicate on second-generation cellular (2G) networks only, rather than later standards such as 4G, and will no longer work when 2G networks are phased out, as has been happening since 2016 in different regions.

These include:

 Nokia 105 (2013), released in 2013 and aimed at markets in developing nations.
 Nokia 105 (2015), developed by Microsoft Mobile and released on 3 June 2015.
 Nokia 105 (2017), developed by HMD Global and released on 17 July 2017.
 Nokia 105 (2019), made by HMD Global, was unveiled on 24 July 2019, and released in September 2019.
 Nokia 105 4G (2021), made by HMD Global, was unveiled on 15 June 2021.

References 

105